Enzo Lamarche (born 18 September 1997) is an Argentine professional footballer who plays as a forward for Deportivo Rauch.

Career
Lamarche began in Santamarina's youth. He was moved into their first-team during the 2017–18 Primera B Nacional campaign, making his professional debut on 11 December 2017 during a defeat to Deportivo Riestra at the Estadio Eduardo Gallardón. He subsequently featured five more times for them in 2017–18 as they finished twenty-fifth. Lamarche left Santamarina in 2018, subsequently having spells with hometown clubs Botafogo Rauch and Deportivo Rauch in Liga Rauchense.

Career statistics
.

References

External links

1997 births
Living people
Sportspeople from Buenos Aires Province
Argentine footballers
Association football forwards
Primera Nacional players
Club y Biblioteca Ramón Santamarina footballers